Darden Hamilton (born November 28, 1956) is a former member of the Arizona State Senate. He served in the Senate from January 1999 until January 2003. He was first elected to the House in November 1998, representing District 16, and was re-elected in 2000. He did not run for re-election in 2002.

References

Republican Party Arizona state senators
1956 births
Living people